Pavel Churavý (born April 22, 1977 in Liberec) is a Czech Nordic combined skier who has competed since 1999.

Career
Competing in three Winter Olympics, he earned his best finish of fifth in the 10 km individual large hill event at Vancouver in 2010.

Churavý's best finish at the FIS Nordic World Ski Championships was sixth in the 4 × 5 km team event at Liberec in 2009 while his best individual finish was eighth in the 10 km individual large hill event at those same championships.

His best World Cup finishes were second twice, earning them in 2002 and 2010.

References

1977 births
Czech male Nordic combined skiers
Living people
Nordic combined skiers at the 2002 Winter Olympics
Nordic combined skiers at the 2006 Winter Olympics
Nordic combined skiers at the 2010 Winter Olympics
Nordic combined skiers at the 2014 Winter Olympics
Olympic Nordic combined skiers of the Czech Republic
Sportspeople from Liberec